Michael Zhan Jiang (born 29 April 1968) is a Chinese former swimmer who competed in the 1988 Summer Olympics.
29 Times China National Champions In Butterfly Event. Lifetime Member Of American Swimming Coaches Association.

References

1968 births
Living people
Chinese male butterfly swimmers
Olympic swimmers of China
Swimmers at the 1988 Summer Olympics